Zhang Binbin (born 19 January 1993), also known as Vin Zhang, is a Chinese actor. He made his acting debut in the show V Love (2014) and received recognition for his roles in Chronicle of Life (2016), The King's Woman (2017), and Rattan (2021).

Career

2014–15: Career beginnings
Vin Zhang made his acting debut in the web melodrama V Love (2014), which was produced by Jay Walk Studio and aired on Tencent. He also released the singles "Our Era" and "Heavenly Stairs" for the drama.

In 2015, Zhang played his first leading role in the youth web drama Long Time No See, which is the sequel to Fleet of Time.

2016–present: Rising popularity
In February 2016, Zhang starred in the historical melodrama Chronicle of Life alongside Hawick Lau and Zheng Shuang. The series saw high ratings and Zhang was acclaimed by netizens and fans of the original novel for his portrayal of his character. Zhang gained further recognition for his role as a mysterious hacker in the hit romance comedy drama Love O2O.

In 2017, Zhang starred in romance comedy Pretty Li Huizhen, the Chinese remake of South Korean series She Was Pretty alongside Dilraba Dilmurat and Peter Sheng, portraying a goofy and free-spirited editor. He then featured in the hit fantasy romance drama Eternal Love, playing a devilish prince named Li Jing of the Ghost Tribe. With his portrayal of three different and striking roles in Love O2O, She Was Pretty and Eternal Love, Zhang received appraisal for his talent in acting by both the media and fans.

Later in 2017, Zhang starred as the male lead in historical drama The King's Woman alongside Dilraba Dilmurat, playing Qin Shi Huang. He earned critical acclaim for his portrayal of the domineering yet loyal emperor.

In 2018, Zhang starred in the wuxia romance drama The Flame's Daughter.

In 2019, Zhang played the male lead in wuxia romance drama I Will Never Let You Go alongside Ariel Lin. The same year, he starred in the romance workplace drama Love Is Fate.

In 2021, Zhang starred as the male lead of cyber-security drama Storm Eye, hit fantasy suspense drama Rattan, and romance drama Be Together. 

He left Jaywalk Studios on July 12, 2022 after 10 years. In his announcement, he said that he plans to continue performing and acting in projects in the future. The next day, on July 13th, 2022, he opened his own studio and made his first Weibo post in "Zhang Binbin's official studio" account.

Donations and charity work 
In 2017, Zhang participated along with other celebrities in a public welfare environmental project that encourages the public to perform charity. Zhang later participated in the BAZAAR Stars’ Charity Night organised by Harpers Bazaar where he donated ambulances to the public.

Filmography

Television series

Variety show

Discography

Singles

Awards and nominations

References

External links 
 

Chinese male television actors
21st-century Chinese male actors
1993 births
Living people
Jay Walk Studio
Male actors from Jiangsu
Shanghai Theatre Academy alumni